Sanguine or red chalk is chalk of a reddish-brown colour, so called because it resembles the colour of dried blood.  It has been popular for centuries for drawing (where white chalk only works on coloured paper). The word comes via French from the Italian sanguigna and originally from the Latin "sanguis".

Technique 
Sanguine lends itself naturally to sketches, life drawings, and rustic scenes. It is ideal for rendering modeling and volume, and human flesh. In the form of wood-cased pencils and manufactured sticks, sanguine may be used similarly to charcoal and pastel. As with pastel, a mid-toned paper may be put to good use. A fixative may be applied to preserve the finished state of the drawing. The pigment used in sanguine sticks comes from red earths such as red ochre. Sanguines are also available in several other tones such as orange, tan, brown, beige.

Gallery

See also 
 Conté
 Trois crayons

References 

Red chalk: material, history and application in art, J.den Hollander

Red chalk: map of historic mining sites with references to sources, J.den Hollander, B.Reissland, N.Wichern, I.Joosten (2019) 

Drawing
Visual arts materials
Shades of red
Shades of brown